The Falkland Islands general election of 1981 was held on Thursday 1 October 1981 to elect members to the Legislative Council. Six Councillors were elected through universal suffrage, one from each constituency (Camp, East Falkland, East Stanley, West Falkland, West Stanley and Stanley).

Results
Candidates in bold were elected.  Candidates in italic were incumbents.

Camp constituency

East Falkland constituency

East Stanley constituency

Stanley constituency

West Falkland constituency

West Stanley constituency

Notes

References

1981 elections in South America
General election
1981
Non-partisan elections
1981 elections in the British Empire
October 1981 events in South America